Benzeneselenol, also known as selenophenol, is the organoselenium compound with the formula C6H5SeH, often abbreviated PhSeH. It is the selenium analog of phenol. This colourless, malodorous compound is a reagent in organic synthesis.

Synthesis
Benzeneselenol is prepared by the reaction of phenylmagnesium bromide and selenium:
PhMgBr  +  Se   →   PhSeMgBr
PhSeMgBr  +  HCl   →   PhSeH  +  MgBrCl

Since benzeneselenol does not have a long shelflife, it is often generated in situ.  A common method is by reduction of diphenyldiselenide.  A further reason for this conversion is that often, it is the anion that is sought.

Reactions
More so than thiophenol, benzeneselenol is easily oxidized by air. The facility of this reaction reflects the weakness of the Se-H bond, bond dissociation energy of which is estimated to be between 67 and 74 kcal/mol. In contrast, the S-H BDE for thiophenol is near 80 kcal/mol. The product is diphenyl diselenide as shown in this idealized equation:
 
The presence of the diselenide in benzeneselenol is indicated by a yellow coloration.  The diselenide can be converted back to the selenol by reduction followed by acidification of the resulting PhSe−.

PhSeH is acidic with a pKa of 5.9. Thus at neutral pH, it is mostly ionized:
 PhSeH  →  PhSe−  +  H+
It is approximately seven times more acidic than the related thiophenol.  Both compounds dissolve in water upon the addition of base. The conjugate base is PhSe−, a potent nucleophile.

History
Benzeneselenol was first reported in 1888 by the reaction of benzene with selenium tetrachloride (SeCl4) in the presence of aluminium trichloride (AlCl3).

Safety
The compound is intensely malodorous and, like other organoselenium compounds, toxic.

References

Organoselenium compounds
Selenols
Phenyl compounds
Foul-smelling chemicals
Reagents for organic chemistry